William Morris Dally (February 22, 1908 – May 30, 1996) was an American rower who competed in the 1928 Summer Olympics.

In 1928, he was part of the American boat, which won the gold medal in the eights.

References

External links
 
 
 
 

1908 births
1996 deaths
American male rowers
Olympic gold medalists for the United States in rowing
Rowers at the 1928 Summer Olympics
Medalists at the 1928 Summer Olympics